The Cottbus-Drewitz Solarpark is a  photovoltaic power station, located on a former military airfield. It was completed in 11 weeks using Suntech STP 280 Wp panels.

See also 

Photovoltaic power stations
List of photovoltaic power stations

References 

Photovoltaic power stations in Germany
Economy of Brandenburg
2011 establishments in Germany